Del Turco is an Italian surname. Notable people with the surname include:

 Flaminio del Turco (died 1634), Italian architect and sculptor
 Ottaviano Del Turco (born 1944), Italian politician
 Riccardo Del Turco (born 1939), Italian singer
 Stefano Rosselli del Turco, Marquis, (1877–1947), Italian chess player, writer and publisher

See also 

 Turco (surname)
 Del Turco (disambiguation)

Italian-language surnames